It's Great to be Young is the third comedy album released by Northern Irish comedian and actor James Young.

The album cover features a picture taken by Stanley Matchett of Young in drag seated on a bench in the grounds of the City Hall, Belfast. The back cover features sleeve notes by Young.

Track listing

Side 1
 Meet James Young - 6:54
 Carpenter Crimmond - 4:03
 Living in Hope - 6:59
 The Ould Blackman - 2:38
 Romeo And Juliet - 11:22

Side 2
 The Chambermaid - 13:22
 The Feud - 7:21
 At The Labour Exchange - 2:40
 The Critic - 5:25

Re-release
Emerald Music re-released the album in 1999 in a four-disc boxset to commemorate the 25th anniversary of Young's death. The album was boxed with three of Young's other comedy albums (Young at Heart, James Young Sings Ulster Party Pieces and James Young's 4th). The album was marketed as James Young: Ireland's Greatest Comic Legend Volume 2.

References

1968 albums
James Young (comedian) albums